Paweł Kaczmarek (born 1 July 1985) is a Polish professional footballer who plays as a midfielder for Stal Poniatowa.

Career
In February 2011, he was loaned to Górnik Łęczna.

References

External links
  
 Profile at Znicz Pruszków 

1985 births
Living people
Amica Wronki players
Wigry Suwałki players
Arka Gdynia players
Radomiak Radom players
Znicz Pruszków players
Korona Kielce players
Polish footballers
Górnik Łęczna players
ŁKS Łódź players
OKS Stomil Olsztyn players
Wisła Płock players
Motor Lublin players
Stal Kraśnik players
KSZO Ostrowiec Świętokrzyski players
Ekstraklasa players
I liga players
III liga players
Association football midfielders